Hamda Al Qubaisi (born 8 August 2002) is an Emirati female racing driver who currently races in the Formula Regional European Championship for Prema Racing. In June 2021, she became the first woman in the history of Italian F4 to score a podium, achieving third place in the first race of the season at Misano.

Career

Karting 
Hamda started karting in 2015 and was the first Emirati to be invited to the FIA-sponsored CIK-FIA Karting Academy Trophy in 2016. She finished 3rd in the IAME X30 Championship in 2017.

Lower formulae

2019 
Hamda made her debut in Italian F4 in the middle of the 2019 season when she joined her older sister Amna Al Qubaisi at the Abu Dhabi Racing by Prema team, run in cooperation with the Iron Lynx structure.

2020 
After winning three races on home soil in the United Arab Emirates' F4 series in 2020, she returned for a full campaign in Italy with Iron Lynx and claimed two points finishes.

2021 
In the 2021 Formula 4 UAE Championship, Hamda secured a further three wins, one pole position, and six podiums, to clinch fourth place in the standings once more. In her main campaign, she took part in the Italian F4 Championship. During the round held at Misano in June 2021, Hamda became the first ever woman to step on the podium in the championship, taking third place behind Leonardo Fornaroli and Oliver Bearman. In the process, she also managed to secure her first podium in Europe. She added three more points finishes and ended the championship in 17th place, with 24 points.

Formula Regional 
During pre-season, Hamda took part in the 2022 Formula Regional Asian Championship with Evans GP. Unfortunately, she was unable to take points and finished the championship 28th.

For 2022, Hamda contested a full season of the Formula Regional European Championship with Prema Powerteam.

FIA Formula 3 Championship 
Hamda was selected to take part in testing the FIA Formula 3 car on 16–17 September 2022, alongside three other women at Magny-Cours.

Personal life 
Hamda is the younger sister of Amna Al Qubaisi and the daughter of Khaled Al Qubaisi, CEO of Real Estate and Infrastructure Investment platform at Mubadala Investment Company, and who is also an accomplished figure in UAE motorsport. She had been attending New York University Abu Dhabi, but continued with her schooling in Italy until October 2021.

Racing record

Career summary 

† As Al Qubaisi was a guest driver, she was ineligible to score points.
* Season still in progress.

Complete Italian F4 Championship results 
(key) (Races in bold indicate pole position) (Races in italics indicate fastest lap)

Complete Formula 4 UAE Championship results 
(key) (Races in bold indicate pole position; races in italics indicate fastest lap)

* Season still in progress.

Complete Formula Regional Asian Championship results
(key) (Races in bold indicate pole position) (Races in italics indicate the fastest lap of top ten finishers)

Complete Formula Regional European Championship results 
(key) (Races in bold indicate pole position) (Races in italics indicate fastest lap)

References

External links 
 

2002 births
Living people
Emirati racing drivers
Italian F4 Championship drivers
Prema Powerteam drivers
Formula Regional Asian Championship drivers
ADAC Formula 4 drivers
Formula Regional European Championship drivers
UAE F4 Championship drivers
Iron Lynx drivers
Emirati female racing drivers
F1 Academy drivers
MP Motorsport drivers